Rana Abdelhamid (Arabic: رنا عبد الحميد; born May 6, 1993) is an American  political candidate and activist. She lives in Queens, New York. Abdelhamid is also the founder of Hijabis of New York and the Women's Initiative for Self Empowerment.

Early life and education 
Abdelhamid is of Egyptian descent and grew up in New York. She has three siblings. As a child, she studied karate. Abdelhamid became a shotokan karate martial artist. She holds a black belt in Tai Chi karate and as a student she taught young girls karate to combat race-based violence.

Abdelhamid attended Middlebury College as a Posse Foundation Scholar, where she majored in international politics and economics. At Middlebury, she and others organized a local chapter of Amnesty International USA. After graduating from Middlebury, she attended Harvard Kennedy School of Government after earning a Harry S. Truman Scholarship. She is a recipient of the 2015 United Nations Association of the United States of America Leo Nevas Human Rights Youth Award, and the Running Start Rising Political Star.

Career 
She has spent her professional career working for Google.

Malikah (formerly Women's Initiative for Self Empowerment) 

Abdelhamid first pitched her idea for a self-defence class with women teaching women to her imam at the Queens Community Centre when she was sixteen. This was after she had been attacked on the street by a man who tried to take off her headscarf. The class was rejected, but Abdelhamid continued to pitch the idea and held her first class for Women's Initiative for Self Empowerment (WISE) in 2010. Since then, WISE chapters have been created in other parts of the United States and internationally, in Edinburgh, Dublin, and Madrid. The program grew to incorporate a summer camp in New York called Mentee Muslimah. Abdelhamid describes creating WISE as "part of her 'healing process,'" according to Elle. She told National Catholic Reporter that so-called "hijab grabs" are a common experience for Muslim women. The organization has evolved to Malikah, a global collective of women committed to building security and power for communities.

Hijabis of New York

In 2014, Abdelhamid started a social media project called "Hijabis of New York" in order to "humanize and diversify the public narratives of Muslim women who wear hijabs," according to PBS. The project is hosted on Facebook and takes the form of interviews conducted by Abdelhamid accompanied by photographs from various professionals. In 2017, she and Maryam Aziz of WISE, along with Robie Flores and Alison Withers created a Self-Defense Starter Kit, which includes online resources and videos for Muslim women.

2022 U.S. House campaign

On April 14, 2021, Abdelhamid announced her candidacy for the 2022 U.S. House of Representatives election in New York's 12th congressional district against incumbent Carolyn Maloney. She was endorsed by progressive group Justice Democrats, as well as New York City Comptroller Brad Lander. During her campaign, Abdelhamid criticized incumbent Maloney for wearing a burqa in a speech to show the oppression of women in Afghanistan. According to Abdelhamid, oppression of women in Afghanistan is an "Islamophobic narrative" meant "to justify American wars" and Afghan women don't actually require support or "saving".
Abdelhamid withdrew after new district boundary maps were released.

Personal life
Abdelhamid is a member of the Democratic Socialists of America.

References

1993 births
Living people
American Muslims
Activists from New York City
Middlebury College alumni
Harvard Kennedy School alumni
American people of Egyptian descent
Members of the Democratic Socialists of America
Muslim socialists
New York (state) socialists
American female karateka
American tai chi practitioners